Eriogonum sphaerocephalum is a species of wild buckwheat known by the common names rock buckwheat and round-headed desert buckwheat. It is native to the western United States.

Habitat 
Eriogonum sphaerocephalum can be found primarily east of the crest of the Cascade Range, in Washington and Oregon to Idaho and from southern Oregon and northern California to northern Nevada. It is a common member of desert, rocky and sagebrush steppe habitats.

Description

Fresh blooms occur in early summer.

The inflorescence arises on a stalk and bears many yellow flowers in a head-like cluster or umbel.

Varieties
There are several varieties of this species:
E. s. var. fasciculifolium is endemic to Idaho.
E. s. var. halimioides is a widespread variety with very pale yellow flowers.
E. s. var. sphaerocephalum has bright yellow flowers.

References

External links

Photo gallery

sphaerocephalum
Flora of the Northwestern United States
Flora of California
Flora of Nevada
Flora of the Sierra Nevada (United States)
Flora without expected TNC conservation status